Sevastopol was the last of three ships in the  of pre-dreadnought battleships built for the Imperial Russian Navy in the 1890s.

Named for the siege of Sevastopol during the Crimean War, the ship was commissioned into the First Pacific Squadron of the Russian Pacific Fleet and was stationed at Port Arthur (today Lüshunkou District, Dalian, Liaoning, China), a Russian naval base acquired from China in 1898 as part of the Kwantung Leased Territory. She was laid down in May 1892, launched on 1 June 1895 and completed in 1899. Her sea trials lasted until 1900.

Sevastopol saw service in the Russo-Japanese War of 1904–1905. Slightly damaged during a surprise attack on Port Arthur in early February, the ship later participated in several attempts to break out from the besieged port. The most notable of these was the Battle of the Yellow Sea, where she was damaged by several shells but managed to make it back to port with the remnants of the Russian Fleet, leaving one crewman dead and 62 wounded. Immediately after the surrender of Port Arthur, Sevastopol was scuttled to prevent her capture by the Imperial Japanese Navy. The Japanese never raised her. The remains of the ship still lie outside the entrance to the port.

Design and description
The design of the Petropavlovsk-class ships was derived from the battleship , but was greatly enlarged to accommodate an armament of four  and eight  guns. While under construction their armament was revised to consist of more powerful 12-inch guns and the 8-inch guns were replaced by a dozen  guns. Designed to displace , Sevastopol was almost  overweight and displaced  when completed. The ship was powered by two vertical triple-expansion steam engines, each driving one shaft, using steam generated by 16 cylindrical boilers. She had a crew of 662.

The Petropavlovsk-class ships' main battery consisted of four 12-inch guns mounted in two twin-gun turrets, one each forward and one aft of the superstructure. Designed to fire one round per 90 seconds, the actual rate of fire was half that. Their secondary armament consisted of twelve Canet six-inch quick-firing (QF) guns. Eight of these were mounted in four twin-gun wing turrets and the remaining guns were positioned in unprotected embrasures on the sides of the hull amidships. Smaller guns were carried for defense against torpedo boats, including ten QF  Hotchkiss guns and twenty-eight Maxim QF  guns. They were also armed with six torpedo tubes, four  tubes above water and two  submerged tubes, all mounted on the broadside. They carried 50 mines to be used to protect her anchorage.

The Russians could not manufacture the Harvey armor used by Sevastopol, so the ship's armor was ordered from Bethlehem Steel in America, although only her waterline armor belt was made from Harvey armor and the rest was nickel steel.

Construction and career

Sevastopol, named for the siege of Sevastopol during the Crimean War, was laid down at the Galernii Island shipyard in Saint Petersburg on 7 March 1892. Construction was led by two engineers, E. P. Andruschenko and N. I. Afanasyev, and began on 7 May 1892, about the same time as the battleship  was laid down. The ceremony was attended by Alexander III of Russia and then-Tsesarevich Nicholas II. Sevastopol was launched on 1 June 1895 and, after the completion of her hull and decks in 1898, was transferred to Kronstadt where her armor and guns were installed. Sevastopol was finished in 1899 and Nikolai Chernishev became her captain, a post which he would retain until 17 March 1904, when Nikolai Essen assumed command.

Sevastopol began her sea trials on 16 October 1899, and was commissioned after their conclusion into the Imperial Russian Navy. She and her sister ships were transferred to Port Arthur, which was then the base of the First Squadron of the Russian Pacific Fleet. In September 1900, Popov radios were installed on Sevastopol and her sister Poltava, the first Russian battleships to have them. They were also painted white, the same color as the other ships in the First Pacific Squadron. She then left for Port Arthur, arriving on 13 April 1901. As Russia was not at war with any Far East countries at that time, Sevastopol stayed in port, inactive.

Battle of Port Arthur 

After the Japanese victory in the First Sino-Japanese War of 1894–1895, both Russia and Japan had ambitions to control Manchuria and Korea, resulting in tensions between the two nations. Japan had begun negotiations to reduce the tensions in 1901, but the Russian government was slow and uncertain in its replies because it had not yet decided exactly how to resolve the problems. Japan interpreted this as deliberate prevarication designed to buy time to complete the Russian armament programs. The situation was worsened by Russia's failure to withdraw its troops from Manchuria in October 1903 as promised. The final straws were the news of Russian timber concessions in northern Korea and the Russian refusal to acknowledge Japanese interests in Manchuria while continuing to place conditions on Japanese activities in Korea. These actions caused the Japanese government to decide in December 1903 that war was inevitable. As tensions with Japan increased, the Pacific Squadron began mooring in the outer harbor at night in order to react more quickly to any Japanese attempt to land troops in Korea.

In early February 1904, the Japanese Navy launched a surprise attack on the Russian fleet at Port Arthur. Sevastopol was hit by one shell, either six or eight inches in diameter, that wounded two men on her bridge. She soon turned in pursuit along with other ships of the Russian fleet, all firing their forward guns, but she failed to score any hits. After the attack on Port Arthur, the First Pacific Squadron tried to break out several times. During one attempt on 23 June, Admiral Wilgelm Vitgeft, commanding the Pacific Fleet, retreated after encountering the Japanese fleet. Approaching the harbor, Sevastopol moved slightly out of formation and hit a mine that killed 11 and caused severe flooding, but managed to get inside the harbor and drop anchor. She was under repair for six weeks, during which time a fire broke out on deck, killing 2 and wounding 28. The Russian battleships were too big to fit into the dry dock at Port Arthur, so large caissons were built to provide access to the ships' hulls. On 9 August, with the Japanese Third Army assaulting the outer defenses of Port Arthur, the First Pacific Squadron sortied from its base. Even though Sevastopol was not fully repaired, she sailed with the rest of the fleet with one gun in her aft turret remaining inoperable. They later engaged the Japanese fleet in what would become the Battle of the Yellow Sea.

Although in the center of the Russian line during the battle, Sevastopol was only slightly damaged during the day. The Japanese battleships returned fire and Sevastopol suffered several shell hits to her superstructure, which killed one man and wounded 62 others. Soon after that, when it seemed that the Russians would be able to escape to Vladivostok, two 12-inch shells from  penetrated the conning tower of the Russian flagship , killing Vitgeft and the helmsman, severely wounding the captain, and causing the ship to come to a dead stop after executing a sharp turn. Thinking that this was a maneuver planned by Vitgeft, the Russian line started to execute the same turn, causing all of the ships directly behind Tsesarevich, including Sevastopol, to maneuver wildly to avoid hitting the stationary flagship. Prince Pavel Ukhtomski, second in command of the squadron, who was on the Peresvet, proceeded to signal the other Russian ships via semaphore to steam back to Port Arthur, although the signals were only gradually recognized by Pobeda, Poltava,  and Sevastopol. Sevastopol had one  and two  guns knocked out during the battle.

Returning to Port Arthur on 10 August, the squadron found that the city was already under siege by the Japanese Third Army led by Baron Nogi Maresuke. On 23 August, Sevastopol bombarded a Japanese battery in an effort to escape along with nine smaller ships, but after she neutralized the battery, she returned to port after a Japanese lookout spotted the approaching ships. As she was maneuvering back into Port Arthur, she struck another mine and required repairs. On 5 December the Third Army captured 203 Meter Hill, a crucial position that overlooked the harbor. From there, the Japanese were able to fire on Sevastopol and other ships of the First Pacific Squadron that had survived the Yellow Sea battle. By 9 December four battleships and two cruisers had been sunk by the Japanese. Sevastopol, although hit five times by  shells, managed to move away from the western harbor and out of range of the guns to the minor harbor of White Wolf, where she could be defended by torpedo nets and booms. Within the defensive surroundings of White Wolf, Essen started to plan a sortie through the blockade to Vladivostok or a rendezvous with the Second Pacific Squadron, at that time coaling at Madagascar.

The torpedo boat and destroyer attacks lasted three weeks, during which 80 torpedoes were launched at Sevastopol. Of these, four hit. The four successful torpedoes were launched on 18 December. Three of them hit the torpedo nets that had been placed around the ship, while the other hit one of the ship's propellers. Although severely damaged, Sevastopol remained afloat and sank two destroyers and damaged six others, killing 35 sailors and five officers. A Japanese cruiser attempting to attack Sevastopol was sunk by a mine in the harbor. His other option, a run to Vladivostok, had already been eliminated due to the damage to his propellers by the torpedo. For the act of scuttling Sevastopol, Essen was awarded the Order of St. George. Nevertheless, a dispatch from Tokyo reported that it sank as a result of a Japanese torpedo attack.

Due to the depth of water in which she had sunk, and her position, Sevastopol was the only battleship that was not salvaged by the Japanese at Port Arthur. What remains of her is still outside the entrance to Port Arthur. Poltava, one of her sister ships, was also scuttled at Port Arthur and re-floated as the Japanese .

Notes

Footnotes

Citations

References

Print sources
 
 
 
 
 
 
 
 
 
 
 

 

Online sources
 
 

1895 ships
Ships built at Admiralty Shipyard
Petropavlovsk-class battleships
Maritime incidents in 1905
Shipwrecks in the Yellow Sea
Shipwrecks of the Russo-Japanese War
Battleships of Russia
Scuttled vessels